Rudolf Lutz (born 1951) is a Swiss organist, harpsichordist, conductor and composer.

Education 
Lutz studied at the Zurich University of the Arts, in Zürich and at the University of Music and Performing Arts, Vienna.

Career
From 1973 he was organist of the St. Laurenzen Kirche, a Protestant church in St. Gallen: he gave up the post in 2013. He has taught improvisation at the Schola Cantorum Basiliensis.

J. S. Bach-Stiftung
In 2006 Lutz was appointed artistic director of the J. S. Bach-Stiftung, which is based in St. Gallen. 
The Foundation is engaged in a project to perform and record Bach's complete vocal works at a church in Trogen, a project which began in 2006 and was originally scheduled to take 25 years. The Foundation maintains a choir and an orchestra (founded by Lutz as the "ensemble Schola Seconda Pratica") and features international soloists in the Bach performances.

Publications 
 Wege zur Annäherung an den Bedeutungsgehalt einer Kantate von J. S. Bach –  Improvisatorisch-kompositorische Ansätze. In: Improvisatorische Praxis vom Mittelalter bis zum 18. Jahrhundert. Basler Jahrbuch für historische Aufführungspraxis, Band 38. Amadeus, Winterthur 2007, . Seite 185–215.

References

External links 
 
 
 «Schauerlicher Text – so schön vertont» / Der Dirigent Rudolf Lutz über die Arbeit an J.S. Bachs Kantaten Neue Zürcher Zeitung 21 January 2010

Swiss conductors (music)
Male conductors (music)
1951 births
Living people
21st-century conductors (music)
21st-century male musicians